In persona episcopi is a Latin expression used by the Roman Catholic Church to indicate a union of two or more dioceses in which the dioceses are administered by a single bishop but undergo no alteration to their diocesan structures (e.g. seminaries, cathedrals, curia officials). In its mildest form such a union can be temporary, but in other cases it can be an intermediate step towards a union aeque principaliter or a full union.

Examples 
 Canada: Moosonee and Hearst
 Canada: Ottawa and Alexandria-Cornwall
 Great Britain (Wales): Cardiff and Menevia
 Ireland: Clonfert and Galway, Kilmacduagh and Kilfenora
 Italy: Fossano and Cuneo
 Spain: Huesca and Jaca
 United States: Baltimore and Washington (1939–1947)

See also 

 Canon law (Catholic Church)

References

Catholic Church legal terminology
Catholic canonical structures
Episcopacy in the Catholic Church